Viator is a municipality of Almería province, in the autonomous community of Andalusia, Spain. José Brocca lived here.

Demographics

References

External links
  Viator - Sistema de Información Multiterritorial de Andalucía
  Viator - Diputación Provincial de Almería

Municipalities in the Province of Almería